Ashakara is a French-Swiss produced Burkinabé-Togolese dark comedy film directed by Gérard Louvin, starring James Campbell, Jean-Marc Pasquet, Willy Monshengwo and Bamela Nyanta. It was released in 1991 and entered into the 1992 Cognac International Film Festival, Solothurn Film Festival, Pan African Film Festival and Vevey International Funny Film Festival.

Plot

A traditional African remedy is discovered to be effective against a deadly virus, but a multinational pharmaceutical company does not want it to succeed.

References

External links
 

1991 films
Togolese films
Burkinabé drama films
Films set in Togo
Medical-themed films